Váňa is a Czech surname. Notable people with the surname include:

Bohumil Váňa (1920–1989), Czech table tennis player
Jaroslav Váňa, Czech slalom canoeist
Josef Váňa (born 1952), Czech jockey
Michal Váňa (born 1963), Czech footballer

Czech-language surnames